Judge Foley may refer to:

James Thomas Foley (1910–1990), judge of the United States District Court for the Northern District of New York
Maurice B. Foley (born 1960), judge of the United States Tax Court
Roger D. Foley (1917–1996), judge of the United States District Court for the District of Nevada
Roger Thomas Foley (1886–1974), judge of the United States District Court for the District of Nevada